The Supreme Administrative Court of Finland is the highest court in the Finnish administrative court system, parallel to the Supreme Court of Finland. Its jurisdiction covers the legality of the decisions of government officials, and its decisions are final. Appeals are made to the Supreme Administrative Court from the decisions of the administrative courts of Helsinki, Turku, Hämeenlinna, Kouvola, Kuopio, Vaasa, Oulu, Rovaniemi and Åland, the Market Court, and the Council of State.

In most issues, it is possible to appeal to the Supreme Administrative Court of Finland from the judgment of the administrative court. However, in some case areas of administrative law, an appeal requires a leave of appeal from the Supreme Administrative Court. The most important such area are insurance cases. In some restricted areas of law, for example, in parking fines, the decision of the administrative court is final and cannot be appealed to the Supreme Administrative Court.

In administrative matters, the Supreme Administrative Court has the sole power to grant extraordinary means of appeals, which are the annulment of a decision, a complaint against it, or an extension of the already-lapsed time of appeal.

The Council of State, i.e. the Finnish government, acts in some cases as an administrative authority. The decisions it makes in this competence can be appealed against on the grounds of legality of the decision.

As in all Finnish administrative courts, the legal costs of both parties in the Supreme Administrative Court are born, unless it is reasonable to award the prevailing party all or part of the costs. Nonetheless, when the authority prevails against a private claimant, it must bear all its costs, unless the private party has made a frivolous claim.

The Court has a President, 20 Justices and 4 Temporary Justices, organized into three chambers of five Justices. In addition, there are 16 Expert Counsellors. In cases concerning water, environmental protection and intellectual property, the chamber is composed of five Justices and two Expert Counsellors. In 2011, the Court processed 4044 cases, with an average time of hearing of 12.2 months.

Presidents

See also
The homepage of the Supreme Administrative Court Of Finland

References

External links

Courts in Finland
Law of Finland
Finland
Administrative courts
Judiciary of Finland